Martyanovskaya is a rural locality (a village) in Verkhovskoye Rural Settlement, Tarnogsky District, Vologda Oblast, Russia. The population was 15 as of 2002.

Geography 
Martyanovskaya is located 42 km west of Tarnogsky Gorodok (the district's administrative centre) by road. Pavlovskaya is the nearest rural locality.

References 

Rural localities in Tarnogsky District